Nick Coe (born August 12, 1997) is an American football defensive end for the Orlando Guardians of the XFL. He has also been a member of the New England Patriots and Miami Dolphins. Coe played college football for the Auburn Tigers.

College career
Coe was a member of the Auburn Tigers for four seasons, redshirting as a true freshman. As a sophomore, Nick finished with seven sacks and 13.5 tackles for loss. As a junior, Nick had with 15 total tackles. After his junior season, he announced that he would forgo his senior year and skip the 2020 Outback Bowl.

Professional career
Coe participated in the 2020 NFL Scouting Combine. Coe went undrafted despite being considered a mid-to-late round prospect for the 2020 NFL Draft.

New England Patriots
Nick was signed by the New England Patriots as an undrafted free agent on May 5, 2020. Nick was waived by the Patriots on August 13, 2020.

Miami Dolphins
Coe had a tryout with the Miami Dolphins on August 20, 2020. He was signed to their practice squad on September 7, 2020. He signed a reserve/future contract with the Dolphins on January 5, 2021.
Coe was waived by Miami on July 23, 2021.

Saskatchewan Roughriders
On September 23, 2021 Coe signed with the Saskatchewan Roughriders of the Canadian Football League (CFL). He was released on June 5, 2022.

Edmonton Elks
The Edmonton Elks announced the signing of Coe to their practice roster on June 21, 2022.

Orlando Guardians 
On November 17, 2022, Coe was drafted by the Orlando Guardians of the XFL.

References

External links
Miami Dolphins bio
Auburn Tigers bio

1997 births
Living people
Players of American football from North Carolina
American football defensive ends
Auburn Tigers football players
New England Patriots players
People from Asheboro, North Carolina
Miami Dolphins players
Saskatchewan Roughriders players
Edmonton Elks players
Orlando Guardians players